Mariano Rosati was a member of the Italian Christian Democracy, and was an Italian Senator from Lombardy. He did not seek for re-election in 1953.

His daughter Anna Maria Rosati, born on May 4, 1905, is still alive and is therefore among the supercentenarians.

Political career
Rosati was the chairman of the association of the lawyers of the Province of Como. In 1948 he was nominated for the Senate by the DC despite not being a member of the party, but he joined it after his victory. Not being a politician, he retired in 1953.

See also
Italian Senate election in Lombardy, 1948

Footnotes

External links

Senate website

1869 births
Members of the Italian Senate from Lombardy
Christian Democracy (Italy) politicians
20th-century Italian politicians
Members of the Senate of the Republic (Italy)
Year of death missing